This is a list of the mammal species recorded in Uganda. Of the 331 mammal species in Uganda, seven are endangered, twenty-one are vulnerable, and seventeen are near threatened.

The following tags are used to highlight each species' conservation status as assessed by the International Union for Conservation of Nature:

Some species were assessed using an earlier set of criteria. Species assessed using this system have the following instead of near threatened and least concern categories:

Order: Afrosoricida (tenrecs and golden moles) 

The order Afrosoricida contains the golden moles of southern Africa and the tenrecs of Madagascar and Africa, two families of small mammals that were traditionally part of the order Insectivora.

Family: Tenrecidae (tenrecs)
Subfamily: Potamogalinae
Genus: Micropotamogale
 Ruwenzori otter shrew, Micropotamogale ruwenzorii NT
Genus: Potamogale
 Giant otter shrew, Potamogale velox LC
Family: Chrysochloridae
Subfamily: Chrysochlorinae
Genus: Chrysochloris
 Stuhlmann's golden mole, Chrysochloris stuhlmanni LC

Order: Macroscelidea (elephant shrews) 

Often called sengis, the elephant shrews or jumping shrews are native to southern Africa. Their common English name derives from their elongated flexible snout and their resemblance to the true shrews.

Family: Macroscelididae (elephant shrews)
Genus: Elephantulus
 Short-snouted elephant shrew, Elephantulus brachyrhynchus LC
 Dusky-footed elephant shrew, Elephantulus fuscipes DD
 Rufous elephant shrew, Elephantulus rufescens LC
Genus: Rhynchocyon
 Checkered elephant shrew, R. cirnei

Order: Tubulidentata (aardvarks) 

The order Tubulidentata consists of a single species, the aardvark. Tubulidentata are characterised by their teeth which lack a pulp cavity and form thin tubes which are continuously worn down and replaced.

Family: Orycteropodidae
Genus: Orycteropus
 Aardvark, O. afer

Order: Hyracoidea (hyraxes) 
The hyraxes are any of four species of fairly small, thickset, herbivorous mammals in the order Hyracoidea. About the size of a domestic cat they are well-furred, with rounded bodies and a stumpy tail. They are native to Africa and the Middle East.

Family: Procaviidae (hyraxes)
Genus: Dendrohyrax
 Western tree hyrax, Dendrohyrax dorsalis LC
Genus: Heterohyrax
 Yellow-spotted rock hyrax, Heterohyrax brucei LC
Genus: Procavia
 Cape hyrax, Procavia capensis LC

Order: Proboscidea (elephants) 

The elephants comprise three living species and are the largest living land animals.

Family: Elephantidae (elephants)
Genus: Loxodonta
African bush elephant, L. africana

Order: Primates 

The order Primates contains humans and their closest relatives: lemurs, lorisoids, tarsiers, monkeys, and apes.

 Suborder: Strepsirrhini
 Infraorder: Lemuriformes
 Superfamily: Lorisoidea
 Family: Lorisidae (lorises, bushbabies)
 Genus: Perodicticus
 Potto, Perodicticus potto LR/lc
 Family: Galagidae
 Genus: Galago
 Dusky bushbaby, Galago matschiei LR/nt
 Senegal bushbaby, Galago senegalensis LR/lc
 Genus: Galagoides
 Thomas's bushbaby, Galagoides thomasi LR/lc
 Prince Demidoff's bushbaby, Galagoides demidovii LR/lc
 Genus: Otolemur
 Brown greater galago, Otolemur crassicaudatus LR/lc
Suborder: Haplorhini
Infraorder: Simiiformes
Parvorder: Catarrhini
Superfamily: Cercopithecoidea
Family: Cercopithecidae (Old World monkeys)
Genus: Erythrocebus
 Patas monkey, Erythrocebus patas LR/lc 
Genus: Chlorocebus
 Vervet monkey, Chlorocebus pygerythrus LR/lc
 Tantalus monkey, Chlorocebus tantalus LR/lc
Genus: Cercopithecus
 Red-tailed monkey, Cercopithecus ascanius LR/lc
 L'Hoest's monkey, Cercopithecus lhoesti LR/nt
 Blue monkey, Cercopithecus mitis LR/lc
 De Brazza's monkey, Cercopithecus neglectus LR/lc
 Crested mona monkey, Cercopithecus pogonias LC
Genus: Lophocebus
 Uganda mangabey Lophocebus ugandae
Genus: Papio
 Olive baboon, Papio anubis LR/lc
Subfamily: Colobinae
Genus: Colobus
 Angola colobus, Colobus angolensis LR/lc
 Mantled guereza, Colobus guereza LR/lc
Genus: Procolobus
 Eastern colobus, Procolobus rufomitratus LC
 Ugandan red colobus, Procolobus tephrosceles EN
Superfamily: Hominoidea
Family: Hominidae
Subfamily: Homininae
Tribe: Gorillini
Genus: Gorilla
 Eastern gorilla, Gorilla beringei EN
 Mountain gorilla, Gorilla beringei beringei EN
Tribe: Panini
Genus: Pan
 Common chimpanzee, Pan troglodytes EN

Order: Rodentia (rodents) 

Rodents make up the largest order of mammals, with over 40% of mammalian species. They have two incisors in the upper and lower jaw which grow continually and must be kept short by gnawing.

Suborder: Hystricognathi
Family: Bathyergidae
Genus: Cryptomys
 Ochre mole-rat, Cryptomys ochraceocinereus DD
Family: Hystricidae (Old World porcupines)
Genus: Atherurus
 African brush-tailed porcupine, Atherurus africanus LC
Genus: Hystrix
 Cape porcupine, Hystrix africaeaustralis LC
 Crested porcupine, Hystrix cristata LC
Family: Thryonomyidae (cane rats)
Genus: Thryonomys
 Lesser cane rat, Thryonomys gregorianus LC
 Greater cane rat, Thryonomys swinderianus LC
Suborder: Sciurognathi
Family: Anomaluridae
Subfamily: Anomalurinae
Genus: Anomalurus
 Lord Derby's scaly-tailed squirrel, Anomalurus derbianus LC
 Dwarf scaly-tailed squirrel, Anomalurus pusillus LC
Genus: Anomalurops
 Beecroft's scaly-tailed squirrel, Anomalurops beecrofti LC
Subfamily: Zenkerellinae
Genus: Idiurus
 Flying mouse, Idiurus zenkeri DD
Family: Sciuridae (squirrels)
Subfamily: Xerinae
Tribe: Xerini
Genus: Xerus
 Striped ground squirrel, Xerus erythropus LC
 Unstriped ground squirrel, Xerus rutilus LC
Tribe: Protoxerini
Genus: Funisciurus
 Carruther's mountain squirrel, Funisciurus carruthersi LC
 Fire-footed rope squirrel, Funisciurus pyrropus LC
Genus: Heliosciurus
 Gambian sun squirrel, Heliosciurus gambianus LC
 Red-legged sun squirrel, Heliosciurus rufobrachium LC
 Ruwenzori sun squirrel, Heliosciurus ruwenzorii LC
Genus: Paraxerus
 Alexander's bush squirrel, Paraxerus alexandri LC
 Boehm's bush squirrel, Paraxerus boehmi LC
Genus: Protoxerus
 Forest giant squirrel, Protoxerus stangeri LC
Family: Gliridae (dormice)
Subfamily: Graphiurinae
Genus: Graphiurus
 Lorrain dormouse, Graphiurus lorraineus LC
 Kellen's dormouse, Graphiurus kelleni LC
Family: Spalacidae
Subfamily: Tachyoryctinae
Genus: Tachyoryctes
 Ankole African mole-rat, Tachyoryctes ankoliae
 Rudd's African mole-rat, Tachyoryctes ruddi
Family: Nesomyidae
Subfamily: Delanymyinae
Genus: Delanymys
 Delany's swamp mouse, Delanymys brooksi EN
Subfamily: Dendromurinae
Genus: Dendromus
 Montane African climbing mouse, Dendromus insignis LC
 Kivu climbing mouse, Dendromus kivu LC
 Gray climbing mouse, Dendromus melanotis LC
 Chestnut climbing mouse, Dendromus mystacalis LC
Genus: Steatomys
 Tiny fat mouse, Steatomys parvus LC
Subfamily: Cricetomyinae
Genus: Cricetomys
 Emin's pouched rat, Cricetomys emini LC
 Gambian pouched rat, Cricetomys gambianus LC
Genus: Saccostomus
 Mearns's pouched mouse, Saccostomus mearnsi LC
Family: Cricetidae
Subfamily: Lophiomyinae
Genus: Lophiomys
 Maned rat, Lophiomys imhausi LC
Family: Muridae (mice, rats, voles, gerbils, hamsters, etc.)
Subfamily: Deomyinae
Genus: Acomys
 Gray spiny mouse, Acomys cineraceus LC
 Percival's spiny mouse, Acomys percivali LC
 Wilson's spiny mouse, Acomys wilsoni LC
Genus: Deomys
 Link rat, Deomys ferrugineus LC
Genus: Lophuromys
 Rahm's brush-furred rat, Lophuromys rahmi NT
 Rusty-bellied brush-furred rat, Lophuromys sikapusi LC
 Woosnam's brush-furred rat, Lophuromys woosnami LC
Genus: Uranomys
 Rudd's mouse, Uranomys ruddi LC
Subfamily: Otomyinae
Genus: Otomys
 Barbour's vlei rat, Otomys barbouri EN
 Ruwenzori vlei rat, Otomys dartmouthi VU
 Dent's vlei rat, Otomys denti NT
 Mount Elgon vlei rat, Otomys jacksoni EN
 Tropical vlei rat, Otomys tropicalis LC
Subfamily: Gerbillinae
Genus: Gerbillus
 Agag gerbil, Gerbillus agag DD
Genus: Tatera
 Boehm's gerbil, Tatera boehmi LC
 Kemp's gerbil, Tatera kempi LC
 Bushveld gerbil, Tatera leucogaster LC
 Fringe-tailed gerbil, Tatera robusta LC
 Savanna gerbil, Tatera valida LC
Genus: Taterillus
 Congo gerbil, Taterillus congicus LC
 Emin's gerbil, Taterillus emini LC
 Harrington's gerbil, Taterillus harringtoni LC
Subfamily: Murinae
Genus: Aethomys
 Hinde's rock rat, Aethomys hindei LC
 Kaiser's rock rat, Aethomys kaiseri LC
Genus: Arvicanthis
 African grass rat, Arvicanthis niloticus LC
Genus: Colomys
 African wading rat, Colomys goslingi LC
Genus: Dasymys
 African marsh rat, Dasymys incomtus LC
 Montane shaggy rat, Dasymys montanus VU
Genus: Grammomys
 Forest thicket rat, Grammomys dryas NT
 Ruwenzori thicket rat, Grammomys ibeanus LC
 Macmillan's thicket rat, Grammomys macmillani LC
 Shining thicket rat, Grammomys rutilans LC
Genus: Hybomys
 Moon striped mouse, Hybomys lunaris VU
 Peters's striped mouse, Hybomys univittatus LC
Genus: Hylomyscus
 Beaded wood mouse, Hylomyscus aeta LC
 Montane wood mouse, Hylomyscus denniae LC
 Stella wood mouse, Hylomyscus stella LC
Genus: Lemniscomys
 Buffoon striped grass mouse, Lemniscomys macculus LC
 Typical striped grass mouse, Lemniscomys striatus LC
 Heuglin's Lemniscomys, Lemniscomys zebra LC
Genus: Malacomys
 Big-eared swamp rat, Malacomys longipes LC
Genus: Mastomys
 Guinea multimammate mouse, Mastomys erythroleucus LC
 Natal multimammate mouse, Mastomys natalensis LC
Genus: Mus
 Toad mouse, Mus bufo LC
 Mahomet mouse, Mus mahomet LC
 African pygmy mouse, Mus minutoides LC
 Peters's mouse, Mus setulosus LC
 Thomas's pygmy mouse, Mus sorella LC
 Gray-bellied pygmy mouse, Mus triton LC
Genus: Mylomys
 African groove-toothed rat, Mylomys dybowskii LC
Genus: Myomyscus
 Brockman's rock mouse, Myomyscus brockmani LC
Genus: Oenomys
 Common rufous-nosed rat, Oenomys hypoxanthus LC
Genus: Pelomys
 Creek groove-toothed swamp rat, Pelomys fallax LC
 Hopkins's groove-toothed swamp rat, Pelomys hopkinsi VU
 Issel's groove-toothed swamp rat, Pelomys isseli EN
Genus: Praomys
 De Graaff's soft-furred mouse, Praomys degraaffi VU
 Jackson's soft-furred mouse, Praomys jacksoni LC
 Misonne's soft-furred mouse, Praomys misonnei LC
Genus: Rhabdomys
 Four-striped grass mouse, Rhabdomys pumilio LC
Genus: Stochomys
 Target rat, Stochomys longicaudatus LC
Genus: Thamnomys
 Charming thicket rat, Thamnomys venustus NT
Genus: Zelotomys
 Hildegarde's broad-headed mouse, Zelotomys hildegardeae LC

Order: Lagomorpha (lagomorphs) 
The lagomorphs comprise two families, Leporidae (hares and rabbits), and Ochotonidae (pikas). Though they can resemble rodents, and were classified as a superfamily in that order until the early 20th century, they have since been considered a separate order. They differ from rodents in a number of physical characteristics, such as having four incisors in the upper jaw rather than two.

Family: Leporidae (rabbits, hares)
Genus: Poelagus
 Bunyoro rabbit, Poelagus marjorita LR/lc
Genus: Lepus
 Cape hare, Lepus capensis LR/lc
 African savanna hare, Lepus microtis LR/lc

Order: Erinaceomorpha (hedgehogs and gymnures) 

The order Erinaceomorpha contains a single family, Erinaceidae, which comprise the hedgehogs and gymnures. The hedgehogs are easily recognised by their spines while gymnures look more like large rats.

Family: Erinaceidae (hedgehogs)
Subfamily: Erinaceinae
Genus: Atelerix
 Four-toed hedgehog, Atelerix albiventris LR/lc

Order: Soricomorpha (shrews, moles, and solenodons) 
The "shrew-forms" are insectivorous mammals. The shrews and solenodons closely resemble mice while the moles are stout-bodied burrowers.

Family: Soricidae (shrews)
Subfamily: Crocidurinae
Genus: Crocidura
 Congo shrew, Crocidura congobelgica LC
 Dent's shrew, Crocidura denti LC
 Long-tailed musk shrew, Crocidura dolichura LC
 Savanna shrew, Crocidura fulvastra LC
 Bicolored musk shrew, Crocidura fuscomurina LC
 Jackson's shrew, Crocidura jacksoni LC
 Butiaba naked-tailed shrew, Crocidura littoralis LC
 Moonshine shrew, Crocidura luna LC
 Dark shrew, Crocidura maurisca DD
 Montane white-toothed shrew, Crocidura montis LC
 Ugandan musk shrew, Crocidura mutesae DD
 Savanna dwarf shrew, Crocidura nanilla LC
 African black shrew, Crocidura nigrofusca LC
 Niobe's shrew, Crocidura niobe LC
 African giant shrew, Crocidura olivieri LC
 Small-footed shrew, Crocidura parvipes LC
 Flat-headed shrew, Crocidura planiceps DD
 Roosevelt's shrew, Crocidura roosevelti LC
 Ugandan lowland shrew, Crocidura selina LC
 Lesser gray-brown musk shrew, Crocidura silacea LC
 Kahuzi swamp shrew, Crocidura stenocephala VU
 Tarella shrew, Crocidura tarella VU
 Turbo shrew, Crocidura turba LC
 Savanna path shrew, Crocidura viaria LC
Genus: Paracrocidura
 Greater large-headed shrew, Paracrocidura maxima NT
Genus: Ruwenzorisorex
 Ruwenzori shrew, Ruwenzorisorex suncoides VU
Genus: Scutisorex
 Armored shrew, Scutisorex somereni LC
Genus: Suncus
 Least dwarf shrew, Suncus infinitesimus LC
Genus: Sylvisorex
 Grant's forest shrew, Sylvisorex granti LC
 Johnston's forest shrew, Sylvisorex johnstoni LC
 Moon forest shrew, Sylvisorex lunaris LC
 Climbing shrew, Sylvisorex megalura LC
 Volcano shrew, Sylvisorex vulcanorum LC
Subfamily: Myosoricinae
Genus: Myosorex
 Babault's mouse shrew, Myosorex babaulti VU
 Montane mouse shrew, Myosorex blarina VU

Order: Chiroptera (bats) 
The bats' most distinguishing feature is that their forelimbs are developed as wings, making them the only mammals capable of flight. Bat species account for about 20% of all mammals.

Family: Pteropodidae (flying foxes, Old World fruit bats)
Subfamily: Pteropodinae
Genus: Eidolon
 Straw-coloured fruit bat, Eidolon helvum LC
Genus: Epomophorus
 Ethiopian epauletted fruit bat, Epomophorus labiatus LC
 East African epauletted fruit bat, Epomophorus minimus LC
 Wahlberg's epauletted fruit bat, Epomophorus wahlbergi LC
Genus: Epomops
 Franquet's epauletted fruit bat, Epomops franqueti LC
Genus: Hypsignathus
 Hammer-headed bat, Hypsignathus monstrosus LC
Genus: Lissonycteris
 Angolan rousette, Lissonycteris angolensis LC
Genus: Micropteropus
 Peters's dwarf epauletted fruit bat, Micropteropus pusillus LC
Genus: Myonycteris
 Little collared fruit bat, Myonycteris torquata LC
Genus: Rousettus
 Egyptian fruit bat, Rousettus aegyptiacus LC
Genus: Stenonycteris
 Long-haired rousette, Stenonycteris lanosus LC
Subfamily: Macroglossinae
Genus: Megaloglossus
 Woermann's bat, Megaloglossus woermanni LC
Family: Vespertilionidae
Subfamily: Kerivoulinae
Genus: Kerivoula
 Damara woolly bat, Kerivoula argentata LC
 Spurrell's woolly bat, Kerivoula phalaena NT
 Smith's woolly bat, Kerivoula smithi LC
Subfamily: Myotinae
Genus: Myotis
 Rufous mouse-eared bat, Myotis bocagii LC
 Welwitsch's bat, Myotis welwitschii LC
Subfamily: Vespertilioninae
Genus: Glauconycteris
 Bibundi bat, Glauconycteris egeria DD
 Glen's wattled bat, Glauconycteris gleni VU
 Allen's spotted bat, Glauconycteris humeralis DD
 Butterfly bat, Glauconycteris variegata LC
Genus: Hypsugo
 Broad-headed pipistrelle, Hypsugo crassulus LC
 Eisentraut's pipistrelle, Hypsugo eisentrauti DD
Genus: Mimetillus
 Moloney's mimic bat, Mimetillus moloneyi LC
Genus: Neoromicia
 Cape serotine, Neoromicia capensis LC
 Tiny serotine, Neoromicia guineensis LC
 Heller's pipistrelle, Neoromicia helios DD
 Banana pipistrelle, Neoromicia nanus LC
 Rendall's serotine, Neoromicia rendalli LC
 Somali serotine, Neoromicia somalicus LC
 White-winged serotine, Neoromicia tenuipinnis LC
 Zulu serotine, Neoromicia zuluensis LC
Genus: Pipistrellus
 Tiny pipistrelle, Pipistrellus nanulus LC
 Rüppell's pipistrelle, Pipistrellus rueppelli LC
 Rusty pipistrelle, Pipistrellus rusticus LC
Genus: Scotoecus
 White-bellied lesser house bat, Scotoecus albigula DD
 Light-winged lesser house bat, Scotoecus albofuscus DD
 Dark-winged lesser house bat, Scotoecus hirundo DD
Genus: Scotophilus
 African yellow bat, Scotophilus dinganii LC
 White-bellied yellow bat, Scotophilus leucogaster LC
 Robbins's yellow bat, Scotophilus nucella VU
 Nut-colored yellow bat, Scotophilus nux LC
Subfamily: Miniopterinae
Genus: Miniopterus
 Lesser long-fingered bat, Miniopterus fraterculus LC
 Greater long-fingered bat, Miniopterus inflatus LC
 Natal long-fingered bat, Miniopterus natalensis NT
Family: Rhinopomatidae
Genus: Rhinopoma
 Macinnes's mouse-tailed bat, Rhinopoma macinnesi VU
Family: Molossidae
Genus: Chaerephon
 Duke of Abruzzi's free-tailed bat, Chaerephon aloysiisabaudiae NT
 Gland-tailed free-tailed bat, Chaerephon bemmeleni LC
 Spotted free-tailed bat, Chaerephon bivittata LC
 Chapin's free-tailed bat, Chaerephon chapini DD
 Lappet-eared free-tailed bat, Chaerephon major LC
 Nigerian free-tailed bat, Chaerephon nigeriae LC
 Little free-tailed bat, Chaerephon pumila LC
Genus: Mops
 Angolan free-tailed bat, Mops condylurus LC
 Medje free-tailed bat, Mops congicus NT
 Mongalla free-tailed bat, Mops demonstrator NT
 Midas free-tailed bat, Mops midas LC
 Dwarf free-tailed bat, Mops nanulus LC
 Railer bat, Mops thersites LC
 Trevor's free-tailed bat, Mops trevori VU
Genus: Myopterus
 Bini free-tailed bat, Myopterus whitleyi LC
Genus: Otomops
 Large-eared free-tailed bat, Otomops martiensseni NT
Genus: Tadarida
 Egyptian free-tailed bat, Tadarida aegyptiaca LC
Family: Emballonuridae
Genus: Coleura
 African sheath-tailed bat, Coleura afra LC
Genus: Saccolaimus
 Pel's pouched bat, Saccolaimus peli NT
Genus: Taphozous
 Hamilton's tomb bat, Taphozous hamiltoni NT
 Mauritian tomb bat, Taphozous mauritianus LC
 Egyptian tomb bat, Taphozous perforatus LC
Family: Nycteridae
Genus: Nycteris
 Bate's slit-faced bat, Nycteris arge LC
 Andersen's slit-faced bat, Nycteris aurita DD
 Hairy slit-faced bat, Nycteris hispida LC
 Large-eared slit-faced bat, Nycteris macrotis LC
 Dwarf slit-faced bat, Nycteris nana LC
 Egyptian slit-faced bat, Nycteris thebaica LC
Family: Megadermatidae
Genus: Cardioderma
 Heart-nosed bat, Cardioderma cor LC
Genus: Lavia
 Yellow-winged bat, Lavia frons LC
Family: Rhinolophidae
Subfamily: Rhinolophinae
Genus: Rhinolophus
 Halcyon horseshoe bat, Rhinolophus alcyone LC
 Geoffroy's horseshoe bat, Rhinolophus clivosus LC
 Eloquent horseshoe bat, Rhinolophus eloquens DD
 Rüppell's horseshoe bat, Rhinolophus fumigatus LC
 Hildebrandt's horseshoe bat, Rhinolophus hildebrandti LC
 Lander's horseshoe bat, Rhinolophus landeri LC
 Ruwenzori horseshoe bat, Rhinolophus ruwenzorii VU
Subfamily: Hipposiderinae
Genus: Hipposideros
 Aba roundleaf bat, Hipposideros abae NT
 Sundevall's roundleaf bat, Hipposideros caffer LC
 Cyclops roundleaf bat, Hipposideros cyclops LC
 Sooty roundleaf bat, Hipposideros fuliginosus NT
 Noack's roundleaf bat, Hipposideros ruber LC
Genus: Triaenops
 Persian trident bat, Triaenops persicus LC

Order: Pholidota (pangolins) 

The order Pholidota comprises the eight species of pangolin. Pangolins are anteaters and have the powerful claws, elongated snout and long tongue seen in the other unrelated anteater species.

Family: Manidae
Genus: Manis
 Giant pangolin, Manis gigantea LR/lc
 Ground pangolin, Manis temminckii LR/nt
 Long-tailed pangolin, Manis tetradactyla LR/lc
 Tree pangolin, Manis tricuspis LR/lc

Order: Carnivora (carnivorans) 

There are over 260 species of carnivorans, the majority of which eat meat as their primary dietary item. They have a characteristic skull shape and dentition.
Suborder: Feliformia
Family: Felidae (cats)
Subfamily: Felinae
Genus: Acinonyx
 Cheetah, A. jubatus VU
Genus: Caracal
 Caracal, C. caracal LC
African golden cat, C. aurata 
Genus: Felis
African wildcat, F. lybica 
Genus: Leptailurus
 Serval, Leptailurus serval LC
Subfamily: Pantherinae
Genus: Panthera
Lion, Panthera leo VU
Leopard, Panthera pardus VU
African leopard, Panthera pardus pardus
Family: Viverridae
Subfamily: Viverrinae
Genus: Civettictis
African civet, C. civetta 
Genus: Genetta
 Common genet, Genetta genetta LC
 Rusty-spotted genet, Genetta maculata LC
 Servaline genet, Genetta servalina LC
Family: Nandiniidae
Genus: Nandinia
 African palm civet, Nandinia binotata LC
Family: Herpestidae (mongooses)
Genus: Atilax
 Marsh mongoose, Atilax paludinosus LC
Genus: Bdeogale
 Jackson's mongoose, Bdeogale jacksoni NT
Genus: Crossarchus
 Alexander's kusimanse, Crossarchus alexandri LC
Genus: Dologale
 Pousargues's mongoose, Dologale dybowskii DD
Genus: Helogale
 Common dwarf mongoose, Helogale parvula LC
Genus: Herpestes
 Egyptian mongoose, Herpestes ichneumon LC
Common slender mongoose, Herpestes sanguineus LC
Genus: Mungos
 Banded mongoose, Mungos mungo LC
Family: Hyaenidae (hyaenas)
Genus: Crocuta
 Spotted hyena, Crocuta crocuta LC
Genus: Proteles
 Aardwolf, Proteles cristatus LC
Suborder: Caniformia
Family: Canidae (dogs, foxes)
Genus: Lupulella
 Side-striped jackal, L. adusta 
 Black-backed jackal, L. mesomelas 
Genus: Lycaon
 African wild dog, L. pictus  possibly extirpated
Family: Mustelidae (mustelids)
Genus: Ictonyx
 Striped polecat, I. striatus LC
Genus: Poecilogale
 African striped weasel, Poecilogale albinucha LC
Genus: Mellivora
Honey badger, M. capensis 
Genus: Lutra
 Spotted-necked otter, H. maculicollis NT
Genus: Aonyx
 African clawless otter, A. capensis NT

Order: Perissodactyla (odd-toed ungulates) 

The odd-toed ungulates are browsing and grazing mammals. They are usually large to very large, and have relatively simple stomachs and a large middle toe.

Family: Equidae (horses etc.)
Genus: Equus
 Plains zebra, Equus quagga 
 Maneless zebra, Equus quagga borensis 
Family: Rhinocerotidae
Genus: Ceratotherium
 White rhinoceros, Ceratotherium simum NT extirpated
 Southern white rhinoceros, C. s. simum NT reintroduced

Order: Artiodactyla (even-toed ungulates) 

The even-toed ungulates are ungulates whose weight is borne about equally by the third and fourth toes, rather than mostly or entirely by the third as in perissodactyls. There are about 220 artiodactyl species, including many that are of great economic importance to humans.
Family: Suidae (pigs)
Subfamily: Phacochoerinae
Genus: Phacochoerus
 Common warthog, Phacochoerus africanus
Subfamily: Suinae
Genus: Hylochoerus
 Giant forest hog, Hylochoerus meinertzhageni LR/lc
Genus: Potamochoerus
 Bushpig, Potamochoerus larvatus LR/lc
 Red river hog, Potamochoerus porcus LR/lc
Family: Hippopotamidae (hippopotamuses)
Genus: Hippopotamus
 Hippopotamus, Hippopotamus amphibius VU
Family: Tragulidae
Genus: Hyemoschus
 Water chevrotain, Hyemoschus aquaticus DD
Family: Giraffidae (giraffe, okapi)
Genus: Giraffa
 Giraffe, Giraffa camelopardalis VU
Genus: Okapia
 Okapi, Okapia johnstoni EN extirpated
Family: Bovidae (cattle, antelope, sheep, goats)
Subfamily: Alcelaphinae
Genus: Alcelaphus
 Hartebeest, Alcelaphus buselaphus LR/cd
Genus: Damaliscus
 Topi, Damaliscus lunatus LR/cd
Subfamily: Antilopinae
Genus: Gazella
 Grant's gazelle, Gazella granti LR/cd
Genus: Madoqua
 Günther's dik-dik, Madoqua guentheri LR/lc
Genus: Neotragus
 Bates's pygmy antelope, Neotragus batesi LR/nt
Genus: Oreotragus
 Klipspringer, Oreotragus oreotragus LR/cd
Genus: Ourebia
 Oribi, Ourebia ourebi LR/cd
Genus: Raphicerus
 Steenbok, Raphicerus campestris LR/lc
Subfamily: Bovinae
Genus: Syncerus
African buffalo, S. caffer 
Genus: Tragelaphus
 Giant eland, Tragelaphus derbianus NT possibly extirpated
 Bongo, Tragelaphus eurycerus LR/nt extirpated
 Lesser kudu, Tragelaphus imberbis LR/cd
 Common eland, Tragelaphus oryx LR/cd
 Bushbuck, Tragelaphus scriptus LR/lc
 Sitatunga, Tragelaphus spekii LR/nt
 Greater kudu, Tragelaphus strepsiceros LR/cd
Subfamily: Cephalophinae
Genus: Cephalophus
 Peters's duiker, Cephalophus callipygus LR/nt
 Bay duiker, Cephalophus dorsalis LR/nt
 Blue duiker, Cephalophus monticola LR/lc
 Black-fronted duiker, Cephalophus nigrifrons LR/nt
 Red-flanked duiker, Cephalophus rufilatus LR/cd
 Yellow-backed duiker, Cephalophus silvicultor LR/nt
 Weyns's duiker, Cephalophus weynsi LR/nt
Genus: Sylvicapra
 Common duiker, Sylvicapra grimmia LR/lc
Subfamily: Hippotraginae
Genus: Hippotragus
 Roan antelope, Hippotragus equinus LR/cd
Genus: Oryx
 East African oryx, Oryx beisa EN possibly extirpated
Subfamily: Aepycerotinae
Genus: Aepyceros
 Impala, Aepyceros melampus LR/cd
Subfamily: Reduncinae
Genus: Kobus
 Waterbuck, Kobus ellipsiprymnus LR/cd
 Kob, Kobus kob LR/cd
Genus: Redunca
 Mountain reedbuck, Redunca fulvorufula LC
 Bohor reedbuck, Redunca redunca LR/cd

Notes

References

See also
List of chordate orders
Lists of mammals by region
List of prehistoric mammals
Mammal classification
List of mammals described in the 2000s

Uganda
Uganda
Mammals